Ricca may refer to:

Surname
Battista Mario Salvatore Ricca (born 1956), prelate of the Vatican Bank
Bernardino Ricca (1450–?), Italian painter
Federico Ricca (born 1994), Uruguayan footballer
Giorgia Ricca, Italian curler
Giovanni Ricca (1603–c. 1656), Italian painter
Jim Ricca (1927–2007), American football player
Pasquale Ricca (1854–1910), Italian painter and sculptor
Paul Ricca (1897–1972), Italian-American mobster
Pietro Ricca (1838–?), Italian painter
Prospero Ricca (1838–1895), Italian painter
Renzo L. Ricca (born 1960), Italian-born applied mathematician

Given name
Ricca Allen (1863–1949), Canadian-born stage and film actress
Ricca Slone (born 1947), former member of the Illinois House of Representatives

Place
Palazzo Ricca, Naples
Riccas Corner, California

Legendary characters
Rhitta Gawr, sometimes called Ricca, a Welsh giant
Ricca, chief elder of Cornwall in Culhwch and Olwen, possibly Ricatus king of Cornwall